Victoria Park station may refer to:

Australia
 Victoria Park railway station, Melbourne
 Victoria Park railway station, Perth
 Victoria Park bus station, in Western Australia

Canada
 Victoria Park station (Toronto), a subway station on the Line 2 Bloor-Danforth in Toronto, Ontario
 Victoria Park station (Kitchener), an LRT station on the Ion service in Kitchener, Ontario

Hong Kong 
 Causeway Bay North station, also known as Victoria Park, a proposed railway station on the North Island Line

United Kingdom
 Victoria Park railway station (Northern Ireland), a station served by the Belfast and County Down Railway
 Victoria Park railway station (England), in London, the capital city of the United Kingdom
 Whiteinch Victoria Park railway station, Glasgow, Scotland